Khairulnizam bin Mohd Afendy (born 27 May 1993) is a Malaysian sailor who competed at the 2012 Summer Olympics in the men's Laser class, finishing 47th.

References

External links
 
 
 

1993 births
Living people
Malaysian male sailors (sport)
Olympic sailors of Malaysia
Sailors at the 2012 Summer Olympics – Laser
Sailors at the 2016 Summer Olympics – Laser
Sailors at the 2020 Summer Olympics – Laser
Asian Games medalists in sailing
Asian Games silver medalists for Malaysia
Sailors at the 2010 Asian Games
Sailors at the 2014 Asian Games
Sailors at the 2018 Asian Games
Medalists at the 2014 Asian Games
Medalists at the 2018 Asian Games
Southeast Asian Games bronze medalists for Malaysia
Southeast Asian Games gold medalists for Malaysia
Southeast Asian Games silver medalists for Malaysia
Southeast Asian Games medalists in sailing
Competitors at the 2007 Southeast Asian Games
Competitors at the 2019 Southeast Asian Games
Malaysian Muslims
Malaysian people of Malay descent